The Twister is a fictional character, a comic book superhero who first appeared in Blue Bolt Comics from Novelty Press.

Publication history
Created by Paul Gustavson, The Twister appeared in short stories in issues #1 to #7 of Blue Bolt Comics, volume two (June to December, 1941). After that, he wasn't seen again for decades.

In 2009, he appeared in the Dynamite Entertainment miniseries Black Terror, which is part of the Project Superpowers line of comics; he then appeared in Project Superpowers: Chapter Two as an ally of the heroes.

Fictional biography

Novelty Press
Bob Sanders is a direct descendant of Odysseus, and thus inherited the curse of the wind god Aeolus to retrieve the "bad winds" Odysseus had accidentally released. When Bob was 14, a cyclone descended on his home town of Windy Gap and killed his parents, but Bob himself was lifted into the sky and brought back to earth unharmed. He wasn't unchanged, however; he now had the power to harness the wind and generate and control whirlwinds, and he had super-strength. Donning a costume and calling himself The Twister, he used his new abilities to combat evil. He also armed himself with a "Cyclone Gun," which shot powerful blasts of air.

Dynamite Entertainment
At some point after World War II, The Twister was captured and imprisoned in the mystical Urn of Pandora, along with scores of other heroes, by the misguided Fighting Yank. Decades later, the Urn was broken and the heroes freed; Twister emerged with a new costume, whose constantly shifting appearance makes him look like a man-shaped tornado, but his powers seem to be unchanged. What part he will play in the modern world remains to be seen.

References

Comics characters introduced in 1941
Dynamite Entertainment characters
Golden Age superheroes
Novelty Press